Hindolveston is a village and civil parish in the English county of Norfolk.

History
Hindolveston has an entry in the Domesday Book of 1085.  In the great book Hindolveston is recorded by the name Hidolfestuna and Hidolvestuna.  It is said to be in the ownership of the Bishop William. The survey also notes a church, twenty cattle, two beehives and forty goats. The name is theorized to come from Anglo-Saxon language Hildwulfes tūn = "farmstead belonging to a man called Sword-wolf".

Hindolvestone railway station [sic] served the village from 1882 to 1959.

Saint George parish church
Saint George’s parish church was built in the 1932 to replace an earlier church which stood on the edge of the village. The old church had become unusable when the tower collapsed in August 1892. The church has a 1930s style and is the work of a local builder called Jonathan Beckett to a design by the Diocesan architect, Herbert Green, which had been prepared at the turn of the 20th century. These plans, which had been drawn soon after the collapse of the old church, were adapted in the 1930s and have produced a church with a mixture of architectural features such as brick buttresses and lancet windows. Material was rescued from the old church and has been included in the new one including the old church font with vandalised panels, but not re-cut which show the Crucifixion, Instruments of the Passion and a Holy Trinity symbol. Also salvaged at the time were some brass inscriptions and a fine figure brass for Edward and Margaret Hunt and their 14 children.

Transport
The nearest railway station is at Sheringham for the Bittern Line which runs between Sheringham, Cromer and Norwich. The nearest airport is Norwich International Airport.

References

External links

Guide to the history of Hindolveston windmill
Walk around the village and a local map
Hindolveston Parish website 

Villages in Norfolk
Civil parishes in Norfolk
North Norfolk